Archbishop Williams may refer to:

 Rowan Williams, Anglican Archbishop of Canterbury
 Archbishop John Joseph Williams (1822–1907), American Roman Catholic prelate and the first Archbishop of Boston
 John Williams, Archbishop of York (1582–1650), Archbishop of York, 1641–1650
 Thomas Leighton Williams (1877–1946), Roman Catholic archbishop of Birmingham, England
 Thomas Stafford Williams (born 1930), New Zealand Cardinal and Archbishop of Wellington
 Gwilym Owen Williams (1913–1990), Anglican Archbishop of Wales, 1971–1982
 Archbishop Williams High School, a co-educational Catholic school in Braintree, Massachusetts

Williams, Archbishop